LoanDepot, sometimes stylized as loanDepot, is an Irvine, California-based nonbank holding company which sells mortgage and non-mortgage lending products.

History
LoanDepot was founded in 2009 by entrepreneur Anthony Hsieh, who had previously founded mortgage companies LoansDirect.com which he sold to E*Trade in 2001, and HomeLoanCenter.com, which he sold to LendingTree in 2004. The company's products at the time included fixed rate, jumbo, FHA and home equity loans, in addition to more controversial adjustable-rate mortgages (ARM) and negative amortization products.

In November 2015, loanDepot claimed to be the second largest non-bank provider of direct-to-consumer loans in the United States and postponed a planned IPO, citing poor market conditions. In March 2017, the company introduced technology to automate the loan process, allowing customers to apply for a mortgage without talking to a loan officer. In January 2018, the company announced two products as part of its technology platform, a home improvement unit to allow contractors to offer financing to customers, and Mello Home, a platform to connect pre-approved buyers to realtors. In September 2019, the company partnered with Century 21 Redwood Realty to form a new mortgage platform for the mid-Atlantic area, Day 1 Mortgage.

In 2020, loanDepot made $100 billion of mortgage originations for the first time, with just under 300,000 loans originated, which was twice the amount of loans originated the previous year, according to industry data tracker iEmergent, which also found loanDepot to be the fourth-largest mortgage provider based on the dollar amount of the loans. In 2020, Hsieh was paid "a special one-time discretionary bonus" of $42.5 million, and other executives received smaller bonuses, between $9 million and about $12 million.

loanDepot went public on the New York Stock Exchange on February 11, 2021, under the ticker symbol LDI. Shares were sold at $14 and by September 2021 had lost about half of their value, with the company valued at $2.2 billion.

In March 2021, the company bought the naming rights to Marlins Park, the home ballpark of the Miami Marlins of Major League Baseball and renamed it loanDepot park.

In April 2022, Hsieh stepped down from his role as chairman and CEO to become the executive chairman of the company, and Frank Martell became president and CEO. In July 2022, LoanDepot filed a statement with the Securities and Exchange Commission announcing it would reduce its workforce from 11,300 to 6,500, and that it currently had 8,500 employees. On July 12, the LoanDepot stock price was about $1.50 per share.

Litigation
In 2020, a class action lawsuit was filed against LoanDepot in the U.S. District Court of Arizona alleging violations of a federal robocall law. In September 2021, former LoanDepot chief operations officer Tammy Richards filed a lawsuit against the company in the California Superior Court. In 2021, a class action lawsuit alleging securities fraud was filed against LoanDepot in the U.S. District Court for the Central District of California, and in March 2022, LoanDepot was sued by shareholder Tuyet Vu in the U.S. District Court of Delaware.

References

External links
 
 Tammy Richards Lawsuit Against LoanDepot
 Hoard v. LoanDepot.com, LLC (robocall class action)

Companies based in Orange County, California
Financial services companies established in 2010
Financial services companies of the United States
Mortgage lenders of the United States
2009 establishments in California
Holding companies established in 2009
American companies established in 2009
Companies listed on the New York Stock Exchange